The 1960–61 National Football League was the 30th staging of the National Football League (NFL), an annual Gaelic football tournament for the Gaelic Athletic Association county teams of Ireland.

Kerry won the final by 20 points.

Results

Finals

References

National Football League
National Football League
National Football League (Ireland) seasons